The 1989 New Jersey gubernatorial election was a race for Governor of New Jersey held on November 7, 1989. Incumbent Republican Governor Thomas Kean was term-limited after two consecutive terms. Democrat James Florio, a U.S. Representative from Camden County and a twice-unsuccessful candidate for Governor, defeated Republican Representative Jim Courter in a 24-point landslide.

Primary elections were held on Tuesday, June 6. Courter won the Republican nomination over a large field that included state Attorney General W. Cary Edwards, Speaker of the Assembly Chuck Hardwick, and State Senators Bill Gormley and Gerald Cardinale. Florio, who had run in 1977 and 1981 but declined a third campaign in 1985, won the Democratic nomination with little trouble over Princeton mayor Barbara Boggs Sigmund and former Speaker Alan Karcher.

This is the most recent gubernatorial election in New Jersey in which the Democratic nominee won with over 60% of the vote, and the last in which either party did so until 2013. This was the only gubernatorial election from 1977 to 2013 where Somerset County voted for a Democratic candidate.

Republican primary

Candidates
Tom Blomquist, retired Coast Guard captain
Gerald Cardinale, State Senator from Demarest
Jim Courter, U.S. Representative from Hackettstown
W. Cary Edwards, New Jersey Attorney General
William Gormley, State Senator from Mays Landing
Chuck Hardwick, Speaker of the General Assembly
James A. Kolyer, industrial arts teacher
Lois Rand, former head of the New Jersey Small Business Administration

Speaker Hardwick announced his campaign on February 9.

Campaign
Hardwick presented himself as a slightly more conservative version of Kean, even noting their physical similarities: part of his stump speech was to ask, "How can a Republican Assembly Speaker with a gap-toothed smile, who isn't a lawyer, expect to be Governor?" Nevertheless, he was critical of Kean's proposals for property tax reform, coastal commission to manage growth on the Jersey shore, and his renomination New Jersey Supreme Court Chief Justice Robert Wilentz, a liberal. Hardwick, himself a former commuter, also picked a public fight on behalf of New Jersey commuters with Governor of New York Mario Cuomo, attacking New York's income tax on New Jerseyans working in New York City.

The Hardwick campaign actively sought votes from New Jersey Right to Life, the National Rifle Association, and police officers' groups in an attempt to attract unaffiliated voters into the Republican primary.
Hardwick won some early victories, including a non-binding Middlesex County Republican Convention, where he took 51% of the delegates in a county Courter represented in Congress.

As the campaign concluded and polls showed Courter narrowly behind, he remained confident of victory.

Endorsements

Polling

Results

On election night, Courter declared victory at around 11:15 P.M., after only Hardwick had conceded. He announced that his campaign would focus on lower insurance rates, lower property taxes, and a stronger death penalty. By then aware that Jim Florio would be his opponent, Courter said the race would be "a great confrontation... a great debate between two people." He emphasized his support for Governor Kean, whom he called "the greatest governor this state has ever had." Campaign advisors attributed his win to a strong performance in his own congressional district, where he outpolled the field two-to-one in every county.

Edwards attributed his loss to Gormley: "We're good friends, but if one of us had been candidates, I think that the other one would have won." Hardwick admitted that his campaign had been slipping in internal polling and he had realized he would lose a week before the election. All of the competitive candidates vouched to support Courter actively in the general election.

Aftermath
Edwards would run for Governor once more, in 1993; despite a long trend of New Jersey Republicans nominating a prior runner-up, he was defeated by an upstart candidate, Christine Todd Whitman, who went on to win the election.

Hardwick re-entered the race for his Assembly seat and won by just 173 votes over Neil M. Cohen. He did not seek re-election in 1991 and retired from politics, moving to New York City.

Gormley made two more runs for higher office: U.S. House in 1994 and U.S. Senate in 2000; he lost the Republican primary for both to Frank LoBiondo and Bob Franks, respectively.

Cardinale remained in the New Jersey Senate until his death in 2021. He ran for U.S. House in 2002 but finished third in the Republican primary.

Democratic primary

Candidates
James Florio, U.S. Representative and candidate for Governor in 1977 and 1981
Alan Karcher, former Speaker of the New Jersey General Assembly
Barbara Boggs Sigmund, Mayor of Princeton and former Mercer County Freeholder

Polling

Results

General Election

Candidates
Jim Courter, U.S. Representative from Hackettstown (Republican)
James Florio, U.S. Representative from Camden and nominee for Governor in 1981 (Democratic)
Tom Fuscaldo, owner of a television antenna business (One Eye On) 
Daniel M. Karlan, computer programmer (Libertarian)
Catherine Renee Sedwick (Socialist Workers)
Michael Ziruolo, trucking consultant (Better Affordable Government)

Campaign
Florio, who had run in the Democratic primary for Governor in 1977 and lost in an extremely close general election in 1981 to outgoing Governor Thomas Kean, stressed in this campaign that he would govern closer to Kean than the conservative Congressman Courter and that despite the economic growth under Kean and the Reagan administrations, he would lead an active government to combat potential overdevelopment and pollution. Following a Supreme Court ruling that would allow states to impose regulations on abortions, the pro-choice Florio won the votes of those in favor of abortion rights while Courter who comprised an anti-abortion voting record in Congress sought to moderate his views which led to distrust among voters. To moderate his positions, Florio promised a wider use of the state death penalty for drug crimes and not to raise taxes (the latter promise would be broken in 1990 when he signed a $2.8-billion tax increase which would lead to his 1993 defeat).

Polling

Results

References

External links
U.S. Election Atlas

1989
New Jersey
Gubernatorial
November 1989 events in the United States